Environmental Fluid Mechanics is a bimonthly peer-reviewed scientific journal on Earth sciences published by Springer Science+Business Media.

Abstracting and indexing
The journal is abstracted and indexed in:
Current Contents/Physical, Chemical & Earth Sciences
GEOBASE
INSPEC
PASCAL
Science Citation Index Expanded
Scopus
According to the Journal Citation Reports, the journal has a 2018 impact factor of 1.846.

References

External links 
 

Springer Science+Business Media academic journals
English-language journals
Earth and atmospheric sciences journals
Publications established in 2001
Hybrid open access journals